Nathaniel Foote (21 September 1592 – 20 November 1644), was an early English immigrant and surveyor to Connecticut who was born in Colchester, England. He was part of the settlement party that founded Wethersfield, Connecticut, the oldest town in that state. Foote's wife, Elizabeth, was the sister of John Deming, considered one of the "fathers of Connecticut." In 1635, he surveyed the boundaries between his hometown of Wethersfield and Hartford.

Notable descendants
According to the Foote Family Association of America, there are an estimated one million living United States nationals who are descended from Foote and his wife, Elizabeth Deming.

References

1592 births
1622 deaths
People of colonial Connecticut
English emigrants